It's My Life (also known as It's My Life – The Album) is the debut album by German DJ/production team Sash!, released on 25 August 1997 via Multiply and Polygram labels. Three singles were released from the album: "Encore Une Fois", "Ecuador" and "Stay". Two versions of the album exist, a one-disc version and a later version with a second disc featuring remixes. The album was certified platinum in the UK.

Track listing

Charts

Certifications

References

1997 debut albums
Sash! albums